NASA Heliophysics is an aspect of NASA science that enables understanding the Sun, heliosphere, and planetary environments as a single connected system. In addition to solar processes, this domain of study includes the interaction of solar plasma and solar radiation with Earth, the other planets, and the galaxy. By analyzing the connections between the Sun, solar wind, and planetary space environments, the fundamental physical processes that occur throughout the universe are uncovered. Understanding the connections between the Sun and its planets will allow for predicting the impacts of solar interaction on humans, technological systems, and even the presence of life itself. This is also the stated goal of Science Mission Directorate's Heliophysics Research.

Local effects

The Sun is an active star, and Earth is located within its atmosphere, so there is a dynamic interaction.  For example, the Sun' light influences all life and processes on Earth.  It is an energy provider that allows and sustains life on earth. However, the Sun also produces streams of high energy particles known as the solar wind, and radiation that can harm life or alter its evolution. Additionally, under the protective shield of earth's magnetic field and its atmosphere, NASA science sees the Earth as an island in the universe where life has developed and flourished. The origins and fate of life on Earth are intimately connected to the Sun's behavior. Hence, NASA science studies Heliophysics from this perspective.

Heliophysics research program

Methods have been developed to see into the internal workings of the Sun and understand how the earth's magnetosphere responds to solar activity. Further studies are concerned with exploring the full system of complex interactions that characterize the relationship of the Sun with the Solar System. According to NASA, understanding these connections is especially critical as we contemplate our destiny in the third millennium. Heliophysics is needed to facilitate the accelerated expansion of human experience beyond the confines of our earthly home. Recent advances in technology allow us, for the first time, to realistically contemplate voyages beyond the solar system.

There are three primary objectives that define the multi-decadal studies needed:

 To understand the changing flow of energy and matter throughout the Sun, Heliosphere, and Planetary Environments. 
 To explore the fundamental physical processes of space plasma systems. 
 To define the origins and societal impacts of variability in the Earth-Sun System. 
 A combination of interrelated elements is used to achieve these objectives. They include complementary missions of various sizes; timely development of enabling and enhancing technologies; and acquisition of knowledge through research, analysis, theory, and modeling.

A variable star 
Earth is located within the extended atmosphere of a magnetic variable star that drives the local Solar System and sustains life on Earth. The Sun is observed to vary from multiple perspectives. The Sun emits light in the infrared, visible, ultraviolet, and at x-ray energies, and it emits a magnetic field, bulk plasma (the solar wind) and energetic particles moving up to nearly the speed of light, and all of these emissions vary.

The intertwined response of the Earth and heliosphere are studied because this planet is immersed in this unseen yet exotic and inherently dangerous environment. Above the protective cocoon of Earth's lower atmosphere is a plasma soup composed of electrified and magnetized matter entwined with penetrating radiation and energetic particles. The Sun has an impact because modern society depends heavily on a variety of technologies that are susceptible to the extremes of space weather — severe disturbances of the upper atmosphere and of the near-Earth space environment that are driven by the magnetic activity of the Sun. Strong electrical currents driven in the Earth's surface during auroral events can disrupt and damage modern electric power grids and may contribute to the corrosion of oil and gas pipelines.

Main focus

Building on NASA's rich history of exploration of Earth's neighborhood and distant planetary systems, we are poised to provide a predictive understanding of our place in the Solar System. We do not live in isolation; we are intimately coupled with the Sun and the space environment through Earth's climate system, our technological systems, the habitability of planets and Solar System bodies we plan to explore, and ultimately the fate of Earth itself. Variability in this environment affects the daily activities that constitute the underpinning of modern society, including communication, navigation, and weather monitoring and prediction. Because the space environment matters to humans and their technological systems both on Earth and in space, it is essential as a space-faring Nation that we develop an understanding of these space plasma processes.

Heliosphere

Plasmas and their embedded magnetic fields affect the formation, evolution and destiny of planets and planetary systems. The heliosphere shields the Solar System from galactic cosmic radiation. Our habitable planet is shielded by its magnetic field, protecting it from solar and cosmic particle radiation and from erosion of the atmosphere by the solar wind. Planets without a shielding magnetic field, such as Mars and Venus, are exposed to those processes and evolve differently. And on Earth, the magnetic field changes strength and configuration during its occasional polarity reversals, altering the shielding of the planet from external radiation sources.

Magnetospheres

Determine changes in the Earth's magnetosphere, ionosphere, and upper atmosphere in order to enable specification, prediction, and mitigation of their effects. Heliophysics seeks to develop an understanding of the response of the near-Earth plasma regions to space weather. This complex, highly coupled system protects Earth from the worst solar disturbances while redistributing energy and mass throughout.

Space environment

Understand the causes and subsequent evolution of solar activity that affects Earth's space climate and environment. The climate and space environment of Earth are significantly determined by the impact of plasma, particle, and radiative outputs from the Sun. Therefore, it is essential to understand the Sun, determine how predictable solar activity truly is, and develop the capability to forecast solar activity and the evolution of disturbances as they propagate to Earth.

References

Further reading

External links

Heliophysics Integrated Observatory 
NASA video: Understanding The Sun – The Heliophysics Program
NASA video: Introduction to Heliophysics
American Geophysical Union video: Heliophysics and the Weather in Space

Astrophysics
Space science
Space plasmas